Miguel Ángel Socolovich (born July 24, 1986) is a Venezuelan former professional baseball pitcher. He played in Major League Baseball (MLB) for the Baltimore Orioles, Chicago Cubs, St. Louis Cardinals, and Atlanta Braves, and in Nippon Professional Baseball (NPB) for the Hiroshima Toyo Carp.

Professional playing career

Boston Red Sox organization
Socolovich signed with the Boston Red Sox as an international free agent in 2004. He appears to have played for the Venezuelan Summer League Red Sox in 2004, although statistics for the season are lacking. Socolovich did not play in 2005, after undergoing Tommy John surgery on his right elbow. He played in 2006 for the Gulf Coast League Red Sox. Socolovich moved up to Class A the following year, playing for the Lowell Spinners and later the Greenville Drive.

Chicago White Sox organization
On January 28, 2008, the Red Sox traded Socolovich and fellow pitching prospect Willy Mota to the Chicago White Sox for David Aardsma.  Socolovich spent the next four seasons playing in the White Sox organization, taking the field for the Single-A Kannapolis Intimidators and Winston-Salem Dash, Double-A Birmingham Barons, and the Triple-A Charlotte Knights during that time.

Baltimore Orioles organization

Socolo became a free agent and on January 30, 2012, he signed a minor league contract with the Baltimore Orioles.

Major League debut (2012)
He began the 2012 season playing in Triple-A with the Norfolk Tides before earning his first call-up to the major leagues on July 14, 2012.  At the time of his call-up, he had a 1.95 earned run average (ERA) in 24 games with Norfolk. He made six appearances with the Orioles before being designated for assignment on August 14.  He recorded a 6.97 ERA in  innings during his time in Baltimore.  With Norfolk that year, he held a 4−0 win−loss record (W−L) with a 1.90 ERA in 28 appearances and 52 innings pitched (IP), striking out 52 and walking 14 while holding opponents to a .179 batting average against.

Chicago Cubs organization
On August 23, 2012, Socolovich was claimed off waivers by the Chicago Cubs, who optioned him to the Iowa Cubs, their Triple-A affiliate in the Pacific Coast League (PCL).

Hiroshima Toyo Carp
On November 15, 2012, the Hiroshima Toyo Carp of Nippon Professional Baseball agreed to terms with Socolovich to bring him to Japan.

New York Mets organization
On November 21, 2013, Socolovich signed a minor league contract with the New York Mets.

St. Louis Cardinals organization
He joined the St. Louis Cardinals organization on November 12, 2014, who optioned him to the Triple-A Memphis Redbirds of the PCL.  He began the season with a -inning scoreless streak.  During that streak, he walked eight, struck out nine, and allowed five hits in fourteen at bats.  

The Cardinals called Socolovich up for the first time in 2015 on April 30.  He earned his first major league victory on May 3, 2015, after pitching a scoreless 14th inning against the Pittsburgh Pirates.  He earned his second victory the following night, against the Chicago Cubs, who would finish two games and three games, respectively, behind first-place St. Louis in the National League Central division.  The Cardinals optioned him back to Memphis, where he posted a 2.48 ERA and an .165 opponent average and 0.92 WHIP in  IP for the season, and recalled him September 2.  At the major league level in 2015, he finished with a 1.82 ERA and 4−1 record.

Beginning the 2016 season at Memphis, Socolovich authored an 11-inning scoreless streak over nine appearances through June 21.  The Cardinals recalled him to St. Louis on July 19 after third baseman Jhonny Peralta went on the disabled list. His pitch arsenal includes a fastball, changeup, and slider.  At Memphis, Socolovich was 2−5 with a 2.79 ERA in 35 games, inducing 40 strikeouts in  IP.

Socolovich was designated for assignment on May 27, 2017. He was 0–1 with one save in 15 appearances, striking out 14 in  innings. He elected free agency on November 6, 2017.

Atlanta Braves
On January 26, 2018, Socolovich was invited to spring training with the Atlanta Braves. His contract was purchased by the Braves on March 30, 2018. He was later designated for assignment on April 2 in order to make room for Aníbal Sánchez on the active roster. Socolovich cleared waivers and was outrighted to the Gwinnett Stripers. He had his contract purchased again on April 21. He was outrighted to the Gwinnett Stripers for the second time on April 26. He was again called up the Braves on May 30, and outrighted for the third time on June 3. He elected free agency on October 2, 2018.

Guerreros de Oaxaca
On January 30, 2019, Socolovich signed with the Guerreros de Oaxaca of the Mexican League for the 2019 season. He was released on December 19, 2019.

References

External links

1986 births
Living people
Atlanta Braves players
Baltimore Orioles players
Birmingham Barons players
Charlotte Knights players
Chicago Cubs players
Greenville Drive players
Guerreros de Oaxaca players
Gulf Coast Red Sox players
Hiroshima Toyo Carp players
Iowa Cubs players
Kannapolis Intimidators players
Las Vegas 51s players
Leones del Caracas players
Lowell Spinners players
Major League Baseball pitchers
Major League Baseball players from Venezuela
Memphis Redbirds players
Nippon Professional Baseball pitchers
Norfolk Tides players
People from Caracas
St. Louis Cardinals players
Venezuelan expatriate baseball players in Japan
Venezuelan expatriate baseball players in Mexico
Venezuelan expatriate baseball players in the United States
Venezuelan Summer League Ciudad Alianza players
Venezuelan people of Serbian descent
Winston-Salem Dash players